Emmanuel Ofosu Yeboah is a Ghanaian athlete and disability rights activist from Koforidua. Yeboah was born in 1977 with a severely deformed right leg. In the process, he applied for a grant of a bicycle from the Challenged Athletes Foundation (CAF).

After completing the cross-country trek in Ghana, the CAF invited him to participate in the 2002 Triathlon Challenge in San Diego, CA. During the course of Yeboah's visit, doctors from Loma Linda University Medical Center informed him that he was an excellent candidate for a prosthetic leg. Following a successful surgery and six-week recovery, Yeboah entered the CAF triathlon, reducing his time by 3 hours. Yeboah was subsequently awarded the CAF Most Inspirational Athlete of the Year Award and Nike's Casey Martin award.

Yeboah received approximately $50,000 from those awards. Upon returning to Ghana, he used the money to open the Emmanuel Education Fund for promising students with disabilities. In 2005, Yeboah's story was captured in Emmanuel's Gift, narrated by Oprah Winfrey.  He is currently working on building schools for children in Ghana, with or without disabilities. Usually, disabled kids in Ghana have to pay for their education, even at public schools.

References

External links
 Emmanuel Educational Foundation and Sports Academy
 video interview with Emmanuel Ofosu Yeboah in San Diego

Track and field athletes with disabilities
1977 births
Living people
Ghanaian male triathletes
Paratriathletes
Ghanaian male cyclists
Ghanaian disability rights activists
Ghanaian disabled sportspeople
People from Koforidua